Benjamin J. 'BJ, Ben' Nesselhuf is a former Democratic member of the South Dakota Senate,  BJ formerly represented the 17th district from 2004 to 2010. Previously he was a member of the South Dakota House of Representatives from 2001 through 2005. He unsuccessfully ran for South Dakota Secretary of State in 2010.

External links
Ben Nesselhuf for South Dakota Secretary of State Campaign website
South Dakota Legislature - Ben Nesselhuf official SD Senate website

Project Vote Smart - Senator Benjamin J. 'BJ, Ben' Nesselhuf (SD) profile
Follow the Money - Ben Nesselhuf
2008 2006 2004 Senate campaign contributions
2002 2000 House campaign contributions

|-

South Dakota state senators
Members of the South Dakota House of Representatives
1975 births
Living people
People from Rapid City, South Dakota
People from Vermillion, South Dakota